The Beaverhead–Deerlodge National Forest is the largest of the National Forests in Montana, United States. Covering , the forest is broken into nine separate sections and stretches across eight counties in the southwestern area of the state. President Theodore Roosevelt named the two forests in 1908 and they were merged in 1996. Forest headquarters are located in Dillon, Montana. In Roosevelt's original legislation, the Deerlodge National Forest was called the Big Hole Forest Reserve. He created this reserve because the Anaconda Copper Mining Company, based in Butte, Montana, had begun to clearcut the upper Big Hole River watershed. The subsequent erosion, exacerbated by smoke pollution from the Anaconda smelter, was devastating the region. Ranchers and conservationists alike complained to Roosevelt, who made several trips to the area.
(Munday 2001)

The rest of this wilderness extends into the neighboring Deerlodge and Bitterroot National Forests. The Beaverhead section includes most of the Pioneer, Gravelly, and Sapphire Ranges. Both the Centennial and Bitterroot mountain ranges are also located here, with the Continental divide found in the Bitterroot range. Here, in 1805, the Lewis and Clark Expedition first saw the headwaters of the Columbia River, which flow to the Pacific Ocean, and crossed what was then the western boundary of the United States. Lemhi Pass was the point at which the members of the expedition realized that there was not a waterway that would lead from east to west across the continent. Lemhi Pass was designated a National Historic Landmark in 1960. The Lee Metcalf Wilderness, in the Madison mountain range, is a part of what is known as the Greater Yellowstone Ecosystem. However, most of the Lee Metcalf lies in neighboring Gallatin National Forest. The Beaverhead section lies, in descending order of land area, in parts of Beaverhead, Madison, Deer Lodge, and Silver Bow counties. There are local ranger district offices located in Dillon, Ennis, Wisdom, and Wise River.

A number of ghost towns serve as reminders of the extensive mining history of the region. The Deerlodge portion of the forest, located northwest of the Beaverhead portion, lies in sections of Granite, Jefferson, Silver Bow, Deer Lodge, Powell, and Madison counties. There are local ranger district offices located in Butte, Philipsburg, and Whitehall.

Ponderosa pine, and various species of fir, spruce and juniper are the dominant tree species. Almost a third of the forest lands have no forest at all, and are instead rangeland with sagebrush, grass and the occasional cactus. The forest is also home to grizzly bear, cougar, Canadian lynx, bald eagle, bull trout, Arctic grayling, and gray wolf, the latter being a migrant from northern Montana and the Yellowstone wolf reintroduction program in Wyoming. Elk, mule deer, moose, bighorn sheep, pronghorn, coyote, and black bear are more commonly seen.

The Continental Divide National Scenic Trail and the Nez Perce National Historical Trail both pass through sections of the forest.

Forest Service offices administering the National Forest are in Butte, Dillon (which is the headquarters location), Philipsburg, Deer Lodge, Whitehall, Boulder, Ennis, Sheridan, Wise River, Wisdom, and Lima. Interstate 15 and Interstate 90, Montana Highway 43 and Montana Highway 278, and the Pioneer Mountains Scenic Byway all provide access to forest service roads, trailheads and local communities near the forest.

See also

Big Hole River
Butte, Montana
 List of forests in Montana

References

Pat Munday 2001. Montana's Last Best River: The Big Hole River and its People (Lyons Press).

External links
 
 "1922 Inn in Deer Lodge Nat. Park, Nine Miles From Butte, Mont." Popular Mechanics, Oct 1922, p. 586.

National Forests of Montana
National Forests of the Rocky Mountains
Protected areas of Beaverhead County, Montana
Protected areas of Madison County, Montana
Protected areas of Deer Lodge County, Montana
Protected areas of Silver Bow County, Montana
Protected areas of Granite County, Montana
Protected areas of Jefferson County, Montana
Protected areas of Powell County, Montana
 
1908 establishments in Montana
Protected areas established in 1908